The Law Courts Building is a building on Queen's Square in Sydney, Australia. It is the seat of the Supreme Court of New South Wales, as well as parts of the Federal Court of Australia and the High Court of Australia.

Building 
The building is 114 metres tall, with 30 floors to house 34 state and 27 federal courtrooms, and was built in 1976, with the NSW Government and Commonwealth Government sharing the costs of construction. It was designed by Peter Johnson of the prominent architectural firm, McConnell Smith & Johnson, with an emphasis on making courts more 'humane' and accessible in their design.

History 
This would have involved demolishing the Parliament House, the Sydney Hospital, as well as the Sydney Mint.

The courts commenced operation from 17 January 1977 and the Law Courts Building was officially opened by the Premier of New South Wales, Neville Wran, on 1 February 1977.

References 

Government buildings completed in 1977
1977 establishments in Australia
Buildings and structures in Sydney
Brutalist architecture in Australia
Courthouses in Sydney
Supreme Court of New South Wales
High Court of Australia
Federal Court of Australia
Government buildings in Sydney